Route 13  is the most important highway in Laos. It begins at Boten in northern Laos at the Chinese border. It connects the city of Vientiane to Luang Prabang in the north and roughly follows the line of the Mekong River down to the border with Cambodia. The road then continues at National Highway 7 in Cambodia.  Route 13 passes the New Laos National Stadium at Vientiane prefecture and all three international airports in Laos Vientiane Airport, Luang Prabang Airport, and Pakse Airport. Between Boten and Nateuy a 20 km segment of Route 13 is part of the Kunming-Bangkok Expressway, (Asian Highway AH3). From Nateuy to Vientiane, Route 13 is part of AH12 and from Vientiane to the border of Cambodia, AH11. It roughly parallels to Vientiane-Boten Expressway.
 
Route 13 passes through the cities of Vientiane, Vang Vieng, Phoukhoune district where is intersection of Route 7 (Laos), and Luang Prabang. The road is mostly paved, though the pavement is in poor condition at places, it is relatively narrow with sharp curves and there are no markings or lighting on the road everywhere. Several daily buses run from Vientiane to Luang Prabang, taking 8–10 hours.

References

Roads in Laos
Mekong River